Legends FC is an American semi-professional soccer team based in Dallas, Texas, United States. Founded in 1992, the team plays in Region III of the United States Adult Soccer Association, a network of amateur leagues at the fifth tier of the American Soccer Pyramid.

The team plays its home games in the stadium at Richland College. The team's colors are white and red.

History
Legends FC was founded in 1992 by Kanish Ali, an immigrant from Afghanistan, and several friends who played together at the high school, college and club levels.

The team plays in the North Texas Premier Soccer Association, a successful league which is a member of the United States Adult Soccer Association Region III group of leagues. The Legends won the USASA U-23 Cup in 2009, in addition to numerous other local and regional trophies.

The Legends have a long and successful history in competing in the Lamar Hunt U.S. Open Cup. They first qualified for the tournament in 2004, but lost 3-1 to state rivals DFW Tornados in the first round, despite fielding a team that included future MLS players such as Ugo Ihemelu.

They qualified again in 2006 (playing as the Dallas Mustang Legends), but lost again in the first round, this time to USL Premier Development League side Des Moines Menace. After narrowly missing out in qualification in 2008 and 2009 they returned to the competition again in 2010, but lost in the first round for a third time, 3-0 to USSF Division 2 Professional League side FC Tampa Bay.

Players

2014 USASA Region III National Cup roster

2014 Fall NTPSA Division 1A Squad

Notable players
  Bobby Rhine
  Ugo Ihemelu
  T.J. Tomasso
  Esteban Mariel
  Manuel Mariel
  Steven McCarthy
  Dillon Powers

Year-by-year

Managers
  Kanishka Ali (1992–present)

Stadium
 Richland Stadium; Dallas, Texas (????-present)

References

External links

Soccer clubs in Texas
1992 establishments in Texas
Association football clubs established in 1992
Soccer clubs in Dallas